Hieracium stewartii is a species of flowering plant belonging to the family Asteraceae.

Its native range is Northwestern Europe.

References

stewartii